Ruudi is a 2006 Estonian family film directed by Katrin Laur.

Awards:
 2006: MAFF - Multimedia Audiovisual Film Festival (Warsaw, Poland), second prize
 2006: SCHLINGEL International Film Festival (Chemnitz, Germany), audience prize
 2006: Tokyo International Film Festival (Japan), Grand Prix

Plot

Cast
Paul Oskar Soe as Ruudi
Juta Altmets as Vika
Tarvo Langeberg as Ints
Marvo Langeberg as Ants
Mairo Ainsar as Aleks
Guido Kangur as Sass
Aarne Mägi as Enn
Katariina Unt as Karmen, Ruudi's mother 
Aleksander Eelmaa as Jaak Lolle
Ülle Kaljuste as Liivi
Ines Aru as Metsa Aino
Jan Uuspõld as Gynnar
Dan Põldroos as Leif
Indrek Taalmaa as Father of twins
Helga Nurmekann as Folk musician
Ain Hannus as Folk musician
Janek Joost as Head Viking
Juhan Ulfsak as Host of beauty contest
Taavi Eelmaa as Host of beauty contest
Anna-Maria Toom as Beauty contest winner
Raine Tarima as Finn
Väino Puura as Singer
Maie Saulep as Old woman with coat
Rein Pruul as Angry driver
Paul Vahelaan as Customer
Kristel Leesmend as Nurse
Lembit Sarapuu as Old Orm

References

External links
 
 Ruudi, entry in Estonian Film Database (EFIS)

2006 films
Estonian children's films
Estonian-language films